The Audie Award for Best Male Narrator is one of the Audie Awards presented annually by the Audio Publishers Association (APA). It awards excellence in audiobook narration by a man released in a given year. Before 2016 the award was given as the Audie Award for Male Solo Narration. It has been awarded since 1998, when it superseded the Audie Award for Solo Narration.

Winners and finalists

1990s

2000s

2010s

2020s

References

External links 

 Audie Award winners
 Audie Awards official website

Best Male Narrator